Ramazan Şahin (born Ramzan Irbaikhanov, on 8 July 1983) is a Russian-Turkish freestyle wrestler of Chechen descent. He won gold medals at the 2007 World Championships, 2008 European Championships, and 2008 Summer Olympics, placing fifth in 2012. From February 2019 head coach of Turkmenistan national wrestling team.

Career 
He competed for the Istanbul-based club Tekelspor, and then transferred to İstanbul Büyükşehir Belediyesi S.K.

Born in Khasavyurt  in the North Caucasian federal subject Dagestan of the Soviet union, he emigrated in 2005 to Turkey with the help of his uncle İshak İrbayhanov, manager of the Turkey national freestyle wrestling team. In 2006, Ramazan was naturalized with the initiative of Mehmet Ali Şahin, then Minister responsible for Sports and changed his family name to Şahin in respect of his patron.

Coach career 
After the completion of his sports career was one of the coaches of the Turkish national team.

In February 2019 he headed the national team of Turkmenistan in wrestling.

References

External links
 

1983 births
Living people
Turkish Muslims
Olympic wrestlers of Turkey
Wrestlers at the 2008 Summer Olympics
Wrestlers at the 2012 Summer Olympics
Olympic gold medalists for Turkey
Turkish people of Chechen descent
Olympic medalists in wrestling
Chechen martial artists
Chechen people
Medalists at the 2008 Summer Olympics
European champions for Turkey
World Wrestling Championships medalists
Turkish male sport wrestlers
Russian emigrants to Turkey